The Windmills of Schiedam are the tallest windmills in the world. Of nearly 50 sites in and around the city, eight mills stand today. This list includes mills in former municipalities now incorporated into Schiedam.

Windmills

References

Windmills in South Holland
Buildings and structures in Schiedam
Schiedam